Happyland Park was an amusement park in Winnipeg, Manitoba, Canada. Portage Avenue bounded it to the north and the Assiniboine River was to the south. Today this area is part of the Wolseley neighbourhood of Winnipeg. The total cost to construct the park was about $150,000 and were illuminated by 12,000 lights. The main side of the park fronted  of the south side of Portage Avenue with a high wooden fence sporting the word "Happyland" and advertisements detailing the amusements to be found inside. The park opened to the public on May 23 1906.

The main attraction at Happyland Park was the baseball games. The Winnipeg Maroons would play American teams of the Northern League from Duluth, Grand Forks, Fargo, etc. The first game, attended by 4,000 fans, was held on May 24, 1906. It saw the home team lose 7 to 5 to the visiting Duluth team.

By 1914 the owners of the Park had sold off a portion of the land for private residential development.

The park closed in 1922.

Another park of the same name exists today in St. Boniface.

In Guy Maddin's My Winnipeg, the signage and other materials are used in a rooftop homeless encampment.

References

External links
Manitoba Historical SocietyHappyland (Winnipeg)
Closed Canadian Parks

Defunct amusement parks in Canada
Sports venues in Winnipeg
1906 establishments in Manitoba
1922 disestablishments in Manitoba
Downtown Winnipeg